The 2005 If Stockholm Open was an ATP men's tennis tournament played on hard courts and held at the Kungliga tennishallen in Stockholm, Sweden. It was the 37th edition of the event and part of the ATP International Series of the 2005 ATP Tour. The tournament was held from 10 October through 16 October 2005. Sixth-seeded James Blake won the singles title.

Finals

Singles

 James Blake defeated  Paradorn Srichaphan, 6–1, 7–6(8–6)
 It was Blake's 2nd singles title of the year and the 3rd of his career.

Doubles

 Wayne Arthurs /  Paul Hanley defeated  Leander Paes /  Nenad Zimonjić, 5–3, 5–3

References

External links
 Official website 
 ATP tournament profile

 
Stockholm Open
Stockholm Open
If Stockholm Open
Open